Anna Makurat (born 31 March 2000) is a Polish professional basketball player for Dinamo Banco di Sardegna Sassari of the Lega Basket Femminile (LBF) Serie A. She played college basketball for the UConn Huskies.

College career
In 48 games for the UConn Huskies, she averaged 6.5 points, 3.7 rebounds and three assists per game.
  

In April 2021, she left the team, entering the NCAA transfer portal. Within a week, she announced on her Instagram page that she would return to Europe to pursue a professional career.

National team career
Makurat has been a member of the Polish women's national basketball team.

Personal life
Anna's older sister Ola Makurat has played basketball in NCAA Division I for three schools. Ola first played at Liberty from 2016 to 2018, and then transferred to Utah, playing there from 2019 to 2021 after sitting out a season due to NCAA transfer rules. With all NCAA basketball players in 2020–21 being granted an extra season of eligibility due to COVID-19, Ola remained eligible to play college basketball in the 2021–22 season; she chose to exercise her extra season, entering the transfer portal shortly before Anna and eventually choosing to play her final college season at Arkansas State.

References

External links
FIBA profile
Profile at Eurobasket.com
UCONN Bio

2000 births
Living people
Guards (basketball)
People from Lębork
Polish women's basketball players
Polish expatriate basketball people in the United States
UConn Huskies women's basketball players